Siddavanahalli Krishna Sharma (4 July 1904 – 14 October 1973) was a writer, translator, freedom fighter, journalist, social worker and educationist. He was born in the village of Doddasiddavanahalli, near Chitradurga, the third child of Rangachar & Seshamma. Throughout his life, he was an active participant in the freedom struggle, first in Hyderabad, and later in Bangalore.  He identified with many activities and social movements after independence such as the Bhoodan movement.

References

1904 births
1973 deaths
People from Chitradurga
20th-century Indian translators
Journalists from Karnataka
Social workers
20th-century Indian journalists
People from Chitradurga district
Social workers from Karnataka